The 2020–21 season was Al-Qadsiah's first season back in the Pro League following their promotion last year and their 54th year in their existence. Along with competing in the Pro League, the club also participated in the King Cup.

The season covers the period from 22 September 2020 to 30 June 2021.

Players

Squad information

Out on loan

Transfers and loans

Transfers in

Loans in

Transfers out

Loans out

Competitions

Overview

Goalscorers

Last Updated: 30 May 2021

Assists

Last Updated: 30 May 2021

Clean sheets

Last Updated: 30 May 2021

References

Al-Qadisiyah FC seasons
Qadsiah